Lysthaugen is a village in the municipality of Verdal in Trøndelag county, Norway.

References

Verdal
Villages in Trøndelag